Honey Creek Township is one of twelve townships in White County, Indiana, United States. As of the 2010 census, its population was 1,162 and it contained 509 housing units.

Honey Creek Township was organized in 1855. The township took its name from Honey Creek.

Geography

Cities, towns, villages
The one incorporated town in Honey Creek Township is Reynolds, located about five miles west of Monticello at the intersection of Indiana State Road 43 and U.S. Routes 24 and 421, and on the short Toledo, Peoria and Western Railway.

An unincorporated site named Guernsey used to exist on the eastern border with Union Township at what's now the corner of County Roads 325 North and 300 East, consisting of a railroad siding, post office (1882-1907), and grain elevator (removed c. 1950).

Adjacent townships
 Monon Township (north)
 Union Township (east)
 Big Creek Township (south)
 West Point Township (southwest)
 Princeton Township (west)

Cemeteries
The township contains these two cemeteries: Bunnell and Swisher.

Airports and landing strips
 Klopfenstein Airport

School districts
 North White School Corporation

Political districts
 Indiana's 4th congressional district
 State House District 16
 State Senate District 07

References
 United States Census Bureau 2007 TIGER/Line Shapefiles
 United States Board on Geographic Names (GNIS)
 IndianaMap

External links
 Indiana Township Association
 United Township Association of Indiana

Townships in White County, Indiana
Townships in Indiana